Predrag "Peđa" Mijatović (born 19 January 1969) is a Montenegrin retired professional footballer who played as a striker. At club level, Mijatović played for six clubs: Budućnost, Partizan, Valencia, Real Madrid, Fiorentina and Levante. Internationally, he played for FR Yugoslavia at the 1998 FIFA World Cup and at the UEFA Euro 2000.

Mijatović scored 28 goals in the 1995–96 La Liga season for Valencia, which prompted a move to Real Madrid, where he scored a goal in the 1998 UEFA Champions League Final which ensured Madrid's first European Cup in 32 years. In 1997, Mijatović was named runner-up for the Ballon d'Or, behind Ronaldo and ahead of Zinedine Zidane. After his playing career, he served as director of football for Real Madrid from 2006 to 2009.

Club career

Budućnost
From the 1987–88 season, Mijatović became a regular at Budućnost under new head coach Stanko Poklepović. In October 1987, he was a member of the Yugoslav youth squad which competed in and won the 1987 FIFA World Youth Championship in Chile. Upon his return to Budućnost, Mijatović's spot on the squad was now cemented alongside Dejan Savićević, Dragoljub Brnović and Branko Brnović, who also represented Yugoslavia in Chile. Mijatović made 31 league appearances and contributed four goals as Budućnost finished the season in ninth position.

During the winter of 1989–90, Mijatović nearly signed with Hajduk Split after negotiating with Hajduk's sporting director Jurica Jerković, with even a DM50,000 pre-contract payment given to the player. However, Partizan club president Mirko Marjanović stepped in and convinced Mijatović to join the Belgrade-based club instead. In December 1989, Partizan ultimately paid a DM1 million transfer fee to Budućnost for Mijatović. This was at time the highest transfer within the Yugoslav league.

In later interviews, Mijatović said a deteriorating political and security situation in Yugoslavia was a factor in his decision not to join the Croatian club Hajduk.

Partizan
Though he scored on his Partizan debut against his former club Budućnost, Mijatović's debut half season in the new club under head coach Ivan Golac was mostly spent settling into the new surroundings. He failed to score in his following 14 league appearances until the end of the 1989–90 league season.

However, Mijatović continued improving, becoming the squad's undisputed leader during 1991–92 season under head coach Ivica Osim, and leading Partizan to the 1992 Yugoslav Cup title over reigning European Cup champions Red Star Belgrade. He was also named Yugoslav Footballer of the Year award en route.

At Partizan, Mijatović had been linked with various top European sides, which included Juventus. He joined Valencia in the summer of 1993.

Valencia
 
Mijatović made his Valencia debut on 5 September 1993 against Real Oviedo. He won the Spanish Footballer of the Year award in the 1995–96 season, having scored 28 goals in 40 La Liga matches. As the second best goal-scorer in the league, he was the runner-up for the Pichichi Trophy, second only to Juan Antonio Pizzi. Mijatović's contributions helped Valencia finish in second place behind Atlético Madrid that season.

Real Madrid
On 13 February 1996, Mijatović signed an advanced contract with Real Madrid mandating that he join the club from Valencia in the summer of 1996 for a transfer fee of Pta1.5 million. Former Yugoslavia teammate Davor Šuker, Clarence Seedorf, and Roberto Carlos also joined Real Madrid in the summer 1996 transfer window. Coach Fabio Capello often deployed Mijatović in a strike tandem with Šuker, reviving their partnership from their time in Yugoslavia's youth team at the 1987 FIFA World Youth Championship. Over the course of the 1996–97 La Liga season, Mijatović scored a total of 14 goals; he scored one goal in Real Madrid's 2–0 victory over Barcelona the El Clásico on 7 December 1996, escaping from Miguel Ángel Nadal and Laurent Blanc before lifting the ball over Vítor Baía to score. By the end of the season, Real Madrid were first in La Liga and also claimed the 1997 Supercopa de España over Barcelona.

On 20 May 1998, Mijatović scored the winning goal in Real Madrid's 1–0 victory over Juventus in the 1998 UEFA Champions League Final. This was Real Madrid's first UEFA Champions League after 32 years. The following season was Mijatović's final season with Los Blancos; at the end of the season, the 30-year-old Mijatović was sold to Italian Serie A club Fiorentina.

Fiorentina
On 28 June 1999, Mijatović signed a three-year contract with Fiorentina for 17 billion Italian lire. His earliest performances at Fiorentina were promising; in spite of Fiorentina's attacking depth with the likes of Gabriel Batistuta, coach Giovanni Trapattoni initially chose Mijatović as a starter. On 26 July 1999, Mijatović scored the opening goal in Fiorentina's 4–0 victory over Aston Villa in the Gotham Cup finals in New York City, a pre-season exhibition tournament. He played at Fiorentina for two seasons, scoring four goals within the Serie A, and added a Coppa Italia title to his honours. Additionally, he featured in Fiorentina's 1999–2000 UEFA Champions League campaign, which resulted in a third-place finish in Group B of the second group stage behind Manchester United and former club Valencia.

Levante
Mijatović joined Levante UD in the summer of 2002. He played there for one season, after which Levante finished in fourth place in the Segunda División 2002–03 season. He subsequently retired from professional football after struggling with lingering injuries.

International career
Mijatović was included in the squad for the 1987 FIFA World Youth Championship, winning the tournament. He was also called by the main team to UEFA Euro 1992, but the nation would be suspended due to the Yugoslav Wars. He made his senior debut for Yugoslavia in an August 1989 friendly match against Finland.

1998 FIFA World Cup
He played for FR Yugoslavia in the 1998 FIFA World Cup in France, missing a penalty in the match versus the Netherlands.

UEFA Euro 2000
Mijatović played for FR Yugoslavia at UEFA Euro 2000.

He has earned a total of 73 caps, scoring 27 goals. His final international was a June 2003 European Championship qualification match against Azerbaijan.

International goals

Post-playing career
After retiring in 2004, Mijatović continued living in the city of Valencia and soon became a player agent.

In 2006, Mijatović became Real Madrid's director of football, serving in the position for three seasons. During this time, Mijatovic signed important players in Real Madrid's history such as Pepe, Marcelo, Higuaín and Van Nistelrooy.

Through his friendship with Anzhi Makhachkala general manager German Chistyakov, Mijatović was reportedly part of the three-man delegation (the other two were Anzhi's transfer man German Tkachenko and Serbian player agent Vlado Lemić) the Russian club deployed to Milan on 9 August 2011 for initial negotiations with Internazionale (represented by sporting director Marco Branca and vice-president Rinaldo Ghelfi) over the transfer of striker Samuel Eto'o.

Personal
Born in Titograd, SR Montenegro, SFR Yugoslavia, Mijatović grew up in the Masline neighbourhood on the town outskirts and is of the Bjelopavlici clan ancestry.

On 3 June 2009, the official website of Real Madrid stated that Mijatović's son Andrej, aged 15, died after a long illness, and offered its "deepest sympathies on behalf of the entire club and its members".

Career statistics

Club

International

Honours

Partizan
Yugoslav First League: 1992–93
Yugoslav Cup: 1991–92

Real Madrid
La Liga: 1996–97
Supercopa de España: 1997
UEFA Champions League: 1997–98
Intercontinental Cup: 1998

Fiorentina
Coppa Italia: 2000–01

Yugoslavia
1987 FIFA World Youth Championship
1990 UEFA European Under-21 Football Championship (Runners-up)

Individual
Awards
FR Yugoslavia Player of the Year: 1992, 1993, 1998
La Liga Best Foreign Player: 1995–96
Ballon d'Or: Runner-up 1997

Notes

References

External links

Real Madrid profile
Reprezentacija profile

1969 births
Living people
Footballers from Podgorica
Cuce
Association football forwards
Yugoslav footballers
Yugoslavia international footballers
Serbia and Montenegro footballers
Serbia and Montenegro international footballers
1998 FIFA World Cup players
UEFA Euro 2000 players
UEFA Champions League winning players
FK Budućnost Podgorica players
FK Partizan players
Valencia CF players
Real Madrid CF players
ACF Fiorentina players
Levante UD footballers
Yugoslav First League players
La Liga players
Serie A players
Serbia and Montenegro expatriate footballers
Expatriate footballers in Spain
Serbia and Montenegro expatriate sportspeople in Spain
Expatriate footballers in Italy
Serbia and Montenegro expatriate sportspeople in Italy
Association football agents
Real Madrid CF non-playing staff